"Out of the Woodwork" is a comic book storyline based on the Buffy television series and published in Buffy the Vampire Slayer #31-34 by Dark Horse Comics. It was later reprinted in a trade paperback collected edition.

Story description

General synopsis
During one of Sunnydale's hottest summer, the town is suffering from a severe infestation of insects anyone. Strangely, some people are starting to transform into huge demonic insects. Buffy and company must stop this.

Buffy the Vampire Slayer #31
Comic title: Lost and Found

A Sunnydale alleyway becomes the center of some weird happenings. Buffy and her friends try to find out. Meanwhile, Giles has a new girlfriend, but the Scoobies suspect she can't be trusted.

Buffy the Vampire Slayer #32
Comic title: Invasion

The Scooby Gang cope with a ghost in an alleyway and an infestation of really angry insects. Whoever is responsible remains hidden to the gang. Giles seems unusually upbeat thanks to the company of his new woman.

Buffy the Vampire Slayer #33
Comic title: Hive Mentality

Giles' new lady-friend has gone missing and may have been taken by bugmen. Willow and Tara read a dusty volume called Demonic Entomology to try and solve Sunnydale's insect problem. Giles is worried that he might lose another lover yet must rely on Buffy to defeat the insect-threat.

Buffy the Vampire Slayer #34
Comic title: Out of the Fire, Into the Hive

Buffy and her friends discover the secret behind the Sunnydale infestation. Meanwhile, the bug hunt to an end as Buffy challenges a crazy scientist, many nasty bugs, and their Queen.

Continuity
Supposed to be set in Buffy season 4.
Takes place after Past Lives, and before False Memories.

Canonical issues

Buffy comics such as this one are not usually considered by fans as canonical. However, unlike fan fiction, overviews summarizing their story, written early in the writing process, were approved by both Fox and Joss Whedon (or his office), and the books were therefore later published as officially Buffy merchandise.